Gerd Völker (born 26 June 1942) is a German diver. He competed in the men's 10 metre platform event at the 1964 Summer Olympics.

References

External links
 

1942 births
Living people
German male divers
Olympic divers of the United Team of Germany
Divers at the 1964 Summer Olympics
Divers from Berlin